Odail Todd (born 9 June 1994) is a Jamaican sprinter. In 2011 he attended Green Island High in Hanover, Jamaica.

He won the 100 metres at the 2011 World Youth Championships in Athletics in Lille Métropole, France. Todd was only drafted into the event after both 2011 World Youth leader Jazeel Murphy and 2010 Youth Olympic 100 m champion Odean Skeen were forced to withdraw due to injury.

On 15 July, he was added to Jamaica's squad for the 2011 Pan American Junior Athletics Championships in Miramar, Florida. He finished fourth (10.41) in the 100 metres, behind Marvin Bracy (10.09), Keenan Brock (10.12), and Aaron Brown (10.25).

Achievements

References

1994 births
Living people
People from Hanover Parish
Jamaican male sprinters